Bernhard Cuiper (8 October 1913 – 29 April 1999) was a German basketball player. He competed in the men's tournament at the 1936 Summer Olympics.

References

1913 births
1999 deaths
German men's basketball players
Olympic basketball players of Germany
Basketball players at the 1936 Summer Olympics
Sportspeople from Frankfurt